Möckernbrücke is a station of the Berlin U-Bahn network in the western Kreuzberg district, in the vicinity of Potsdamer Platz, named after a nearby bridge crossing the Landwehrkanal. It is served by lines U1, U3, and U7.

Overview

The station, located on a viaduct at the northern shore of the Landwehrkanal, is part of the first Stammstrecke route of the U-Bahn, opened on 15 February 1902. As the station also served the nearby Anhalter Bahnhof, the original building soon got too small to cope with the rising number of passengers. It therefore was demolished and replaced by the current station, opened on 25 March 1937. Severely damaged by air raids, it was closed on 30 January 1944 and not reopened until 16 June 1947.

In the course of the extension of the U7 from Mehringdamm to the west, a twin underground station was built at the southern shore of the Landwehrkanal. The U7 platform opened on 28 February 1966 (architect Rümmler) 
Möckernbrücke became the line's western terminus until the second continuation to Fehrbelliner Platz on 29 January 1971. The U1/U3 and U7 platforms are connected by a glazed bridge over the Landwehrkanal.

References

External links

U1 (Berlin U-Bahn) stations
U3 (Berlin U-Bahn) stations
U7 (Berlin U-Bahn) stations
Buildings and structures in Friedrichshain-Kreuzberg
Railway stations in Germany opened in 1902